Sabratha University ( "Jamaa't Subrata") is one of Libya's largest public universities. It was established in 2015 in the city of Sabratha, Libya  with 18 campuses spread throughout cities on the coast west of the capital Tripoli.

References

Universities in Libya
2015 establishments in Libya
Educational institutions established in 2015